Vacation is the debut studio album by Australian indie pop duo Big Scary. It was released on 7 October 2011. The album debuted and peaked at number 37 on the ARIA Charts. 

At the J Awards of 2011, the album was nominated for Australian Album of the Year.

Background
Big Scary formed in 2006 by Tom Iansek and Joanna Syme, released seven extended plays between 2008 and 2010 and were a constant fixture on Triple J in these years. In July 2011, the duo released "Mixtape" followed by "Gladiator" in September 2011, alongside the album's announcement.

Critical reception 
Beat Magazine called Vacation "an immensely interesting album" highlighting "Falling Away" as the album highlight saying "simple yet evocative piano is driven by steady percussion, all of which is accentuated by dreamy vocals."

Melissa Holden from Purple Sneakers called "Leaving Home" as "the pinnacle of the album" saying "[it] is a beautiful ballad which exquisitely combines heartfelt lyrics, driving drums, a simple yet effective riff and a culminating climax which seems to fill the listener with an inexplicable sense of fullness. The last minute of the track is pure perfection, with a swooning synth, grungy guitar and emotive vocal." Holden said "The album is packed to the punch with hitting tracks that convince the listener to the musician's talent in both songwriting and instrumentation. If you haven't already bought the album, I fully insist you go out there and support this Melbourne duo, you won't regret it."

Dom Alessio from Triple J said "What I love so much about Big Scary's debut is how diverse it is. They effortlessly go from White Stripes-esque rockers like 'Purple' to plaintive ballads like 'Bad Friends', and the record still manages to sound cohesive and unified. Vacation beautifully embodies the "less is more" philosophy of Big Scary's fantastic, minimalist pop music."

Track listing

Charts

Release history

References

2011 debut albums
Big Scary albums